Road Less Traveled is the first studio album by the instrumental rock band Points North. It was recorded at the Foothill College Studio 1100  and released on March 13, 2012 on Magna Carta Records.

The album has been met with positive reviews with the music being compared with artists such as Joe Satriani, Steve Morse and Rush with a strong melodic sensibility. The track "Steve's Morsels" is a nod to guitarist Steve Morse and "Grace Under Pressure" is a tribute to the band Rush.

Track listing

Personnel
 Eric Barnett - guitar, producer
 Kevin Aiello - drums
 Damien Sisson - bass

Credits
 Danny Danzi - audio consultation, mastering - Danziland Studios, Williamstown, NJ
 Dave de Villers - chief engineer, production assistant
 Laura Fielding - logistics
 John Gentry - cover art, design, graphics
 Louis Green - logistics
 Sheri Green - logistics
 Rob Heacock - studio drum tech
 Ken Kilen - additional engineer
 BZ Lewis - mixing @ Studio 132 Oakland, CA 
 Chris Refino - assistant engineer, ProTools operator

Personnel and credits from CD artwork and AllMusic

References

2012 debut albums
Points North albums
Magna Carta Records albums